On July 6, 2017, a 6.5 magnitude earthquake hit Leyte, causing at least 4 deaths and 100 injuries. The quake also caused power interruptions in the whole of Eastern Visayas and nearby Bohol.

The Philippine archipelago is located in the Pacific Ring of Fire, where earthquakes and volcanic activity are common.

Earthquake
The 6.5 magnitude earthquake was recorded by the Philippine Institute of Volcanology and Seismology (PHIVOLCS) to have occurred at 4:03:53 p.m. (16:03:53 UTC+8) and determined it to be of tectonic origin.

The tremor was caused by the movement of the Leyte Segment of the Philippine Fault. A ground rupture was recorded in Barangay Tongonan in Ormoc which was described by the Department of Science and Technology as the epicenter area of the quake.

No tsunami warning was raised by the Pacific Tsunami Warning Center.

Damage

The Department of Public Works and Highways Leyte Fourth Engineering District announced on July 10, 2017 that they estimate that at least  of damage was caused by the earthquake. The local agency said that the city of Ormoc, and nearby town Kananga sustained the heaviest damage.

The earthquake caused a building in Kananga to collapse, causing the deaths of two people. Two more deaths were reported later.

Authorities temporarily closed Ormoc Airport after its runway was damaged.

Ten schools located in the towns of Kananga, Jaro, Barugo, and San Isidro were destroyed by the earthquake while ten more schools located in Inopacan, Albuera, Mérida, Barugo, and San Miguel were partially damaged.

Leyte, Samar and Bohol experienced power blackouts while power supplies in Panay, Cebu, and Negros were also reportedly affected.

Aftermath
PHIVOLCS recorded 796 aftershocks as of noon of July 11, 2017. Ormoc and Kananga declared a state of calamity.

Residents in Lake Danao and Tongonan barangays of Ormoc are to be evacuated due to those localities being situated directly on the path of the Philippine Fault line.

On August 23, 2017, an aftershock of magnitude 5.1 occurred. This aftershock damaged 56 structures in Ormoc. Two people died, one after suffering a head injury after falling and another from a heart attack.

See also
List of earthquakes in 2017
List of earthquakes in the Philippines

References

External links 

2017 disasters in the Philippines
Earthquakes in the Philippines
History of Leyte (province)
July 2017 events in the Philippines